"Don't Call Him a Cowboy" is a song written by Debbie Hupp, Johnny MacRae and Bob Morrison, and recorded by American country music artist Conway Twitty.  It was released in February 1985 as the first single and title track from the album Don't Call Him a Cowboy.  The song was Twitty's 34th Billboard number one single on the country chart but his 50th overall. The single went to number one for one week and spent a total of 13 weeks on the chart.

Content
The song criticizes the Urban Cowboy movement of the early 80's.

Charts

Weekly charts

Year-end charts

References

Songs about cowboys and cowgirls
1985 singles
Conway Twitty songs
Warner Records singles
Songs written by Debbie Hupp
Songs written by Johnny MacRae
Songs written by Bob Morrison (songwriter)
1985 songs